William Aikman may refer to:

 William Aikman (painter) (1682–1731), Scottish portrait-painter
 William Aikman (writer) (1824–1909), American writer and pastor